The Giardino Officinale di Marzana is a municipal botanical garden located in Marzana, Verona, Veneto, Italy.

The garden was established in 1980 by the Corpo forestale di Verona. It contains medicinal and pharmaceutical plants from the Americas, Africa, and Russia, as well as plants used in perfumes and cosmetics.

See also 
 List of botanical gardens in Italy

References 
 Convention on Biological Diversity - Botanic Gardens of Italy
 BGCI entry
 Horti entry (Italian)
 Augusto Rinaldi Ceroni, pages 77-78

Botanical gardens in Italy
Gardens in Veneto